Red House Presbyterian Church, also known as Hugh McAden Gravesite or Red House Church, is a historic Presbyterian church and cemetery located at 13409 NC 119 N in Semora, Caswell County, North Carolina.  The Classical Revival red brick church building was constructed in 1913. It features a portico with four round, fluted wooden Doric order columns. Also on the property is a contributing church cemetery.

The church was added to the National Register of Historic Places in 2007.

References

External links
 

Presbyterian churches in North Carolina
Cemeteries on the National Register of Historic Places in North Carolina
Churches on the National Register of Historic Places in North Carolina
Neoclassical architecture in North Carolina
Churches completed in 1913
Churches in Caswell County, North Carolina
National Register of Historic Places in Caswell County, North Carolina
20th-century Presbyterian church buildings in the United States
Neoclassical church buildings in the United States